American Hotel is a historic hotel located at Sharon Springs in Schoharie County, New York.  It is a large, -story wood-frame structure built between 1847 and 1851 in the Greek Revival style.  It features a recessed 2-story porch with a colonnade of eight pillars with Doric order capitals supporting the roof.  It is located within the Sharon Springs Historic District.

It was listed on the National Register of Historic Places on September 9, 1975.

The hotel and owners Doug Plummer and Garth Roberts appear in the reality television series The Fabulous Beekman Boys, which takes place in Sharon Springs. The series debuted in June 2010.

See also
 History of the National Register of Historic Places
 List of heritage registers
 List of threatened historic sites in the United States
 United States National Register of Historic Places listings
 World Heritage Site

References

External links
The American Hotel

Hotel buildings on the National Register of Historic Places in New York (state)
Hotel buildings completed in 1851
Greek Revival architecture in New York (state)
Buildings and structures in Schoharie County, New York
1851 establishments in New York (state)
National Register of Historic Places in Schoharie County, New York